Kade Simpson (born 5 May 1984) is a former Australian rules footballer who played his entire career with the Carlton Football Club in the Australian Football League (AFL). He played 342 games across 18 seasons from 2003 to 2020. He holds the VFL/AFL record for playing in the most losses of any player, with 215.

Simpson predominantly played  as a half-back flanker, while also spending time as a midfielder.

AFL career

Early career (2002-2005) 
Simpson was drafted in the fourth round of the 2002 AFL Draft. He was Carlton's first pick in that year's draft, after the club was stripped of its higher selections as punishment for salary cap infringements. Carlton were fortunate to have picked Simpson given his skills were immediately apparent, but he did not have enough weight to play regular seniors in his first two seasons; even now, his weight is a relatively light 79 kg. He played primarily for Carlton's , the Northern Bullants, in his first two years, and on his few selections in the Carlton senior team, received so little ground time that he did not have a disposal in his first three games.

Simpson first broke into the senior team as a regular in the latter half of 2005. Still eligible for the AFL Rising Star in his third season on the list, Simpson was nominated in Round 18. He played nine of the last 10 games of the season, missing one game through injury, and his pace and skill began to attract attention.

Leadership Group and John Nicholls Medal (2006-2018) 
Simpson took a big step up in the 2006 season, being elevated to the leadership group and running 4th in the best and fairest. He played every game, mainly as a running link-man from half-back. He finished in the top 5 in the AFL for running bounces, which was typical of his rebound play, averaged 19 disposals with a maximum of 30, and eleven goals. This style of running play prompted Kevin Sheedy to select Simpson for the Australian International Rules team for the 2006 tour of Ireland, and Mick Malthouse to do likewise for in 2008, a series in which he won the Jim Stynes Medal.

By 2007, Simpson had emerged as one of the leaders of the club. He captained the Blues between Rounds 14 and 19 during 2007, in the absence of regular captain and vice-captain Lance Whitnall and Nick Stevens, and has been vice-captain to Chris Judd since Stevens' retirement.

In 2010, Kade Simpson had arguably his best season for the Carlton Football Club, polling nine Brownlow votes (Second for Carlton, behind medal-winner Chris Judd). The most noticeable feature of his performances during the season was his tackling ability, because on 12 occasions he laid five or more tackles.

Simpson played 158 consecutive games from Round 15, 2005, until Round 15, 2012, before missing a match with a broken jaw. He was, at the time, considered the club record holder for most consecutive games, but in December 2012, the AFL amended the interpretation of this record such that Bruce Doull, who missed two club games during his streak due to playing in interstate matches on the same day, assumed the club record with 162 consecutive games.

In the 2013 season, Simpson won the John Nicholls medal, Carltons best and fairest award. Kade had 533 disposals that season, after an outstanding year playing at half-back flank position under new coach Mick Malthouse.

In the 2016 season, Simpson had an outstanding year averaging 27.2 disposals per game. He was nominated in the All Australian squad of 40 but was not named in the final 22. He finished second in Carlton's best and fairest award behind defender Sam Docherty.

300 gamer (2018-2020) 
On 30 June 2018 Simpson became the fifth Carlton player to reach the 300 game milestone.

In 2019, Simpson signed a one-year contract extension to play on in 2020. With the retirement of Daniel Wells at the end of the 2019 season, Simpson became the last remaining survivor from the 2002 AFL draft. He also decided to step down from the club's leadership group that year.

He retired at the end of the 2020 season, finishing with 342 senior games – the third most of any Carlton player in the club's history.

Coaching career 
Simpson was appointed assistant coach of Carlton's AFLW team in November 2020.

Statistics
 Statistics are correct to the end of the 2020 season

|- 
| 2003 ||  || 6
| 3 || 0 || 0 || 0 || 0 || 0 || 0 || 3 || 0.0 || 0.0 || 0.0 || 0.0 || 0.0 || 0.0 || 1.0 || 0
|-
| 2004 ||  || 6
| 3 || 1 || 1 || 7 || 5 || 12 || 4 || 5 || 0.3 || 0.3 || 2.3 || 1.7 || 4.0 || 1.3 || 1.7 || 0
|-
| 2005 ||  || 6
| 15 || 9 || 10 || 118 || 56 || 174 || 57 || 26 || 0.6 || 0.7 || 7.9 || 3.7 || 11.6 || 3.8 || 1.7 || 0
|-
| 2006 ||  || 6
| 22 || 11 || 8 || 296 || 124 || 420 || 147 || 53 || 0.5 || 0.4 || 13.5 || 5.6 || 19.1 || 6.7 || 2.4 || 2
|-
| 2007 ||  || 6
| 22 || 17 || 12 || 281 || 130 || 411 || 103 || 64 || 0.8 || 0.5 || 12.8 || 5.9 || 18.7 || 4.7 || 2.9 || 3
|-
| 2008 ||  || 6
| 22 || 9 || 14 || 242 || 170 || 412 || 137 || 61 || 0.4 || 0.6 || 11.0 || 7.7 || 18.7 || 6.2 || 2.8 || 0
|-
| 2009 ||  || 6
| 23 || 15 || 12 || 287 || 202 || 489 || 129 || 82 || 0.7 || 0.5 || 12.5 || 8.8 || 21.3 || 5.6 || 3.6 || 5
|-
| 2010 ||  || 6
| 23 || 17 || 19 || 328 || 210 || 538 || 142 || 93 || 0.7 || 0.8 || 14.3 || 9.1 || 23.4 || 6.2 || 4.0 || 9
|-
| 2011 ||  || 6
| 24 || 17 || 18 || 361 || 175 || 536 || 147 || 79 || 0.7 || 0.8 || 15.0 || 7.3 || 22.3 || 6.1 || 3.3 || 5
|-
| 2012 ||  || 6
| 19 || 15 || 13 || 267 || 159 || 426 || 106 || 62 || 0.8 || 0.7 || 14.1 || 8.4 || 22.4 || 5.6 || 3.3 || 6
|-
| 2013 ||  || 6
| 24 || 6 || 9 || 350 || 183 || 533 || 140 || 51 || 0.3 || 0.4 || 14.6 || 7.6 || 22.2 || 5.8 || 2.1 || 9
|-
| 2014 ||  || 6
| 22 || 4 || 6 || 349 || 171 || 520 || 139 || 52 || 0.2 || 0.3 || 15.9 || 7.8 || 23.6 || 6.3 || 2.4 || 8
|-
| 2015 ||  || 6
| 20 || 3 || 1 || 285 || 175 || 460 || 118 || 42 || 0.2 || 0.1 || 14.3 || 8.8 || 23.0 || 5.9 || 2.1 || 1
|-
| 2016 ||  || 6
| 22 || 3 || 0 || 383 || 214 || 597 || 152	|| 54 || 0.1 || 0.0 || 17.4 || 9.7 || 27.1 || 6.9 || 2.5 || 3
|-
| 2017 ||  || 6
| 22 || 4 || 3 || 377 || 152 || 529 || 162	|| 59 || 0.2 || 0.1 || 17.1 || 6.9 || 24.0 || 7.4 || 2.7 || 8
|-
| 2018 ||  || 6
| 21 || 4 || 0 || 369 || 180 || 549 || 115 || 42 || 0.2 || 0.0 || 17.6 || 8.6 || 26.1 || 5.5 || 2.0 || 6
|-
| 2019 ||  || 6
| 18 || 3 || 0 || 265 || 101 || 366 || 85 || 46 || 0.2 || 0.0 || 14.7 || 5.6 || 20.3 || 4.7 || 2.6 || 2
|-
| 2020 ||  || 6
| 17 || 1 || 0 || 201 || 63 || 264 || 66 || 19 || 0.1 || 0.0 || 11.8 || 3.7 || 15.5 || 3.9 || 1.1 || 0
|- class="sortbottom"
! colspan=3| Career
! 342 !! 139 !! 126 !! 4766	!! 2470 !! 7236	!! 1949	!! 893 !! 0.4 !! 0.4 !! 13.9 !! 7.2 !! 21.2 !! 5.7 !! 2.6 !! 67
|}

Notes

Honours and achievements 
Team
 2× Pre-season premiership player: 2005, 2007

Individual
 John Nicholls Medal: 2013
 Carlton Vice-captain: 2013–2014, 2016
 Women of Carlton Player Ambassador Award: 2015
 Carltonians High Achiever Award: 2014, 2016
 Inner Blue Ruthless Award: 2013, 2016
 AFL Rising Star nominee: 2005
 Jim Stynes Medal: 2008

References

External links

 
 
 Kade Simpson profile in Blueseum

1984 births
Carlton Football Club players
Living people
Preston Football Club (VFA) players
Australian rules footballers from Victoria (Australia)
Eastern Ranges players
John Nicholls Medal winners
Australia international rules football team players